Kingsley Corners is an unincorporated community in the town of Springfield, Dane County, Wisconsin, United States. It is located at the corner of Kingsley Road and Woodland Drive, just west of the Village of Waunakee. The community is named for Saxton P. Kingsley, who began farming in the area in 1856. The name has fallen out of use with people in the area.

Notes

Unincorporated communities in Dane County, Wisconsin
Unincorporated communities in Wisconsin